William Child (7 August 1884 – 1961) was a British boxer. He competed in the men's middleweight event at the 1908 Summer Olympics.

Child won the Amateur Boxing Association 1908, 1909 and 1911 middleweight title, when boxing out of the Canbridge ABC.

After retiring from boxing he became a University boxing and fencing coach at Cambridge.

References

External links
 

1884 births
1961 deaths
British male boxers
Olympic boxers of Great Britain
Boxers at the 1908 Summer Olympics
Place of birth missing
Middleweight boxers